Ergani, formerly known as Arghni or Arghana, is a district of Diyarbakır Province of Turkey. The district's area is 1489 km. Ergani District is located in the administrative as the Southeastern Anatolia Region, but as a geographical region it is located in Eastern Anatolia. The mayor is Ahmet Kaya (HDP) since 2019. Hüseyin Sayın was appointed as the District Governor.

Çayönü
Near the village of Sesverenpınar, among the Hilar rocks Çayönü hill was first settled in c. 7500 BC, and was continuously inhabited until 5000 BC (but only occasionally since then). Remains have been found from the earlier habitation, one of the most important archaeological finds of its era.

History
Trade has flourished between Ergani and Mesopotamia during the third millennium BC. Ergani has a rich history of being a mining region.

Education 
There exist 107 elementary schools, two Anatolian High Schools and one Anatolian Teacher High School. There exists also a Dicle University Vocational School in Ergani.

Climate
Ergani has a hot-summer Mediterranean climate (Köppen climate classification: Csa).

References

External links
Official City Website 

Kurdish settlements in Turkey
Populated places in Diyarbakır Province
Districts of Diyarbakır Province